The Sri Lanka women's national cricket team toured South Africa in October and November 2013. They played South Africa in three One Day Internationals and three Twenty20 Internationals, losing the ODI series 2–0 and losing the T20I series 2–1.

Squads

Tour Match: South Africa Emerging Players v Sri Lanka

WODI Series

1st ODI

2nd ODI

3rd ODI

WT20I Series

1st T20I

2nd T20I

3rd T20I

References

External links
Sri Lanka Women tour of South Africa 2013/14 from Cricinfo

International cricket competitions in 2013
2013 in women's cricket
Women's international cricket tours of South Africa
Sri Lanka women's national cricket team tours